The Procession Kiosk is a 16th-century historical building on the outer walls of the Gülhane Park next to Topkapı Palace in Istanbul, Turkey. It was used by the Ottoman sultans to receive the salute of processing janissary as well as a pleasure locale. The building is situated across the Sublime Porte.

In 2011, the building was transferred to the Ahmet Hamdi Tanpınar Literature Museum Library .

Gallery

See also
 Topkapı Palace

References

Literature 
 Fanny Davis. Palace of Topkapi in Istanbul. 1970. ASIN B000NP64Z2

Topkapı Palace
Buildings and structures completed in the 16th century
Redevelopment projects in Istanbul
Fatih